Sardar or Sar Dar may refer to:
 Sardar, Chaharmahal and Bakhtiari (سردار - Sardār)
 Sardar, Bashagard (سردر - Sardar), Hormozgan Province
 Sardar, Hajjiabad (سردر - Sardar), Hormozgan Province
 Sar Dar, Kerman (سردر - Sar Dar)
 Sardar, Kermanshah  (سردار - Sardār)
 Sar Dar, Khuzestan (سردر - Sar Dar)
 Sardar, Sistan and Baluchestan (سردر - Sardar)